This list shows countries/disputed countries organized by the languages which are spoken there.

Indo-European languages

Albanian

Armenian

Baltic

Celtic

Germanic

Dutch

English

German

Greek

Iranian

Persian

Other Iranian

Indo-Aryan

Bengali

Domari

Romani

Hindi

Gujarati

Other Indo-Aryan

Italic & Romance

French

Italian

Portuguese

Spanish
The following is a list of the 22 countries where Spanish is an official language:

Other Italic languages

Slavic

Mongolic languages

Turkic languages

Uralic languages

Afro-Asiatic languages

Semitic languages

Arabic

Other Semitic languages

Dravidian languages

Japonic languages

Koreanic languages

Language isolate

South Caucasian languages

Sino-Tibetan languages

Sinitic languages

Mandarin

Wu

Yue

Min

Hakka

Other Sinitic languages

Other Sino-Tibetan

Austronesian languages

Formosan languages

East Formosan

Southern Formosan

Northern Formosan

Rukaic

Tsouic

Malayo-Polynesian languages

Bornean

Philippine

Oceanic

East Fijian

Micronesian

Polynesian

Malayo-Sumbawan

Tungusic languages

Na-Dene

Apachean

Iroquoian

Uto-Aztecan

Austroasiatic

Tai–Kadai

Hmong–Mien

Pama-Nyungan

Note

References

External links
Interactive world map of 10 widely spoken languages by country (Requires Adobe flash)
UNESCO Atlas of the World's Languages in Danger